Toivo Hörkkö (23 October 1898 – 18 December 1975) was a Finnish cyclist. He competed in two events at the 1924 Summer Olympics.

References

External links
 

1898 births
1975 deaths
Finnish male cyclists
Olympic cyclists of Finland
Cyclists at the 1924 Summer Olympics
Cyclists from Saint Petersburg